Suspense is a radio drama series broadcast on CBS Radio from 1940 through 1962.

One of the premier drama programs of the Golden Age of Radio, was subtitled "radio's outstanding theater of thrills" and focused on suspense thriller-type scripts, usually featuring leading Hollywood actors of the era. Approximately 945 episodes were broadcast during its long run, and more than 900 still exist.

Suspense went through several major phases, characterized by different hosts, sponsors, and director/producers. Formula plot devices were followed for all but a handful of episodes: the protagonist was usually a normal person suddenly dropped into a threatening or bizarre situation; solutions were "withheld until the last possible second"; and evildoers were usually punished in the end.

In its early years, the program made only occasional forays into science fiction and fantasy. Notable exceptions include adaptations of Curt Siodmak's Donovan's Brain and H. P. Lovecraft's "The Dunwich Horror", but by the late 1950s, such material was regularly featured.

Alfred Hitchcock
Alfred Hitchcock directed its audition show (for the CBS summer series Forecast). This was an adaptation of The Lodger a story Hitchcock had filmed in 1926 with Ivor Novello. Martin Grams Jr., author of Suspense: Twenty Years of Thrills and Chills, described the Forecast origin of Suspense:
On the second presentation of July 22, 1940, Forecast offered a mystery/horror show titled Suspense. With the co-operation of his producer, Walter Wanger, Alfred Hitchcock received the honor of directing his first radio show for the American public. The condition agreed upon for Hitchcock's appearance was that CBS make a pitch to the listening audience about his and Wanger's latest film, Foreign Correspondent. To add flavor to the deal, Wanger threw in Edmund Gwenn and Herbert Marshall as part of the package. All three men (including Hitch) would be seen in the upcoming film, which was due for a theatrical release the next month. Both Marshall and Hitchcock decided on the same story to bring to the airwaves, which happened to be a favorite of both of them: Marie Belloc Lowndes' "The Lodger." Alfred Hitchcock had filmed this story for Gainsborough in 1926, and since then it had remained as one of his favorites.

Herbert Marshall portrayed the mysterious lodger, and co-starring with him were Edmund Gwenn and character actress Lurene Tuttle as the rooming-house keepers who start to suspect that their new boarder might be the notorious Jack-the-Ripper. [Gwenn was actually repeating the role taken in the 1926 film by his brother, Arthur Chesney. And Tuttle would work again with Hitchcock nearly 20 years later, playing Mrs. Al Chambers, the sheriff's wife, in Psycho.] Character actor Joseph Kearns also had a small part in the drama, and Wilbur Hatch, head musician for CBS Radio at the time, composed and conducted the music specially for the program. Adapting the script to radio was not a great technical challenge for Hitchcock, and he cleverly decided to hold back the ending of the story from the listening audience in order to keep them in suspense themselves. This way, if the audience's curiosity got the better of them, they would write in to the network to find out whether the mysterious lodger was in fact Jack the Ripper. For the next few weeks, hundreds of letters came in from faithful listeners asking how the story ended. Actually a few wrote threats claiming that it was "indecent" and "immoral" to present such a production without giving the solution

1942–1962
In the earliest years, the program was hosted by "The Man in Black" (played by Joseph Kearns or Ted Osborne) with many episodes written or adapted by the prominent mystery author John Dickson Carr.

One of the series' earliest successes and its single most popular episode is Lucille Fletcher's "Sorry, Wrong Number", about a bedridden woman (Agnes Moorehead) who panics after overhearing a murder plot on a crossed telephone connection but is unable to persuade anyone to investigate. First broadcast on May 25, 1943, it was restaged seven times (last on February 14, 1960)each time with Moorehead. The popularity of the episode led to a film adaptation in 1948. Another notable early episode was Fletcher's "The Hitch Hiker" (aired September 2, 1942), in which a motorist (Orson Welles) is stalked on a cross-country trip by a nondescript man who keeps appearing on the side of the road; however, the first performance of "The Hitch-Hiker" actually took place on The Orson Welles Show the previous year. "The Hitch-Hiker" was later adapted for television by Rod Serling as a 1960 episode of The Twilight Zone.

After the network sustained the program during its first two years, the sponsor became Roma Wines (1944–1947), and then (after another brief period of sustained hour-long episodes, initially featuring Robert Montgomery as host and "producer" in early 1948), Autolite Spark Plugs (1948–1954); eventually Harlow Wilcox (of Fibber McGee and Molly) became the pitchman. William Spier, Norman Macdonnell and Anton M. Leader were among the producers and directors.

Suspense received a Special Citation of Honor Peabody Award for 1946.

The program's heyday was in the early 1950s, when radio actor, producer and director Elliott Lewis took over (still during the Wilcox/Autolite run). Here the material reached new levels of sophistication. The writing was taut, and the casting, which had always been a strong point of the series (featuring such film stars as Orson Welles, Joseph Cotten, Henry Fonda, Humphrey Bogart, Judy Garland, Ronald Colman, Marlene Dietrich, Eve McVeagh, Lena Horne, and Cary Grant), took an unexpected turn when Lewis expanded the repertory to include many of radio's famous drama and comedy starsoften playing against typesuch as Jack Benny. Jim and Marian Jordan of Fibber McGee and Molly were heard in the episode "Backseat Driver", which originally aired February 3, 1949.

The highest production values enhanced Suspense, and many of the shows retain their power to grip and entertain. At the time he took over Suspense, Lewis was familiar to radio fans for playing Frankie Remley, the wastrel guitar-playing sidekick to Phil Harris in The Phil Harris-Alice Faye Show. On the May 10, 1951 Suspense, Lewis reversed the roles with "Death on My Hands": A bandleader (Harris) is horrified when an autograph-seeking fan accidentally shoots herself and dies in his hotel room, and a vocalist (Faye) tries to help him as the townfolk call for vigilante justice against him.

With the rise of television and the departures of Lewis and Autolite, subsequent producers (Antony Ellis, William N. Robson and others) struggled to maintain the series despite shrinking budgets, the availability of fewer name actors, and listenership decline. To save money, the program frequently used scripts first broadcast by another noteworthy CBS anthology, Escape. In addition to these tales of exotic adventure, Suspense expanded its repertoire to include more science fiction and supernatural content. By the end of its run, the series was remaking scripts from the long-canceled program The Mysterious Traveler. A time travel tale like Robert Arthur's "The Man Who Went Back to Save Lincoln" or a thriller about a death ray-wielding mad scientist would alternate with more run-of-the-mill crime dramas.

The series expanded to television with the Suspense series on CBS from 1949 to 1954, and again in 1962. The radio series had a tie-in with Suspense magazine which published four 1946–47 issues edited by Leslie Charteris.

The final broadcasts of Yours Truly, Johnny Dollar and Suspense, ending at 7:00 pm Eastern Time on September 30, 1962, are often cited as the end of the Golden Age of Radio. The final episode of Suspense was Devilstone, starring Christopher Carey and Neal Fitzgerald. It was sponsored by Parliament cigarettes.

Opening introductions
There were several variations of program introductions. A typical early opening is this from April 27, 1943:
(MUSIC ... BERNARD HERRMANN'S SUSPENSE THEME ... CONTINUES IN BG)

THE MAN IN BLACK: Suspense!

This is The Man in Black, here again to introduce Columbia's program, Suspense.

Our stars tonight are Miss Agnes Moorehead and Mr. Ray Collins. You've seen these two expert and resourceful players in "Citizen Kane" – "The Magnificent Ambersons" in which Miss Moorehead's performance won her the 1942 Film Critics' Award. Mr. Collins will soon be seen in the Metro-Goldwyn-Mayer Technicolor film, "Salute to the Marines."

Miss Moorehead and Mr. Collins return this evening to their first love, the CBS microphone, to appear in a study in terror by Lucille Fletcher called "The Diary of Sophronia Winters."

The story told by this diary is tonight's tale of... suspense. If you've been with us on these Tuesday nights, you will know that Suspense is compounded of mystery and suspicion and dangerous adventure. In this series are tales calculated to intrigue you, to stir your nerves, to offer you a precarious situation and then withhold the solution... until the last possible moment. And so it is with "The Diary of Sophronia Winters" and the performances of Agnes Moorehead and Ray Collins, we again hope to keep you in...

(MUSIC: ... UP, DRAMATICALLY)

THE MAN IN BLACK: ... Suspense!

Recognition
Suspense was inducted into the National Radio Hall of Fame in 2011.

Since 2007, Radio Classics, on Sirius XM channel 82, has been airing episodes of Suspense. The show is also streamed nightly at 7 pm Pacific time on kusaradio.com from the original masters.

Satire
The familiar opening phrase "tales well-calculated to..." was satirized by Mad as the cover blurb "Tales Calculated to Drive You... Mad" on its first issue (October–November 1952) and continuing until issue #23 (May 1955).

Radio comedians Bob and Ray had a recurring routine lampooning the show called "Anxiety." Their character Commander Neville Putney told stories that were presented as dramatic but were intentionally mundane, with the opening line "A tale well designed to keep you in... Anxiety."

In the “Chicken Heart” sketch on his Wonderfulness album Bill Cosby relates radio programs during his youth “that were scary.”  One is Suspense.

Theater
For PowPAC, San Diego actor-director Robert Hitchcox mounted a 2006 stage production recreating two episodes of  Suspense, complete with commercials, in a stage set designed like a CBS radio studio.

Partial list of episodes of Suspense

1940

1942

1943

1944

1945

1946

1947

1948

1949

1950

1951

1952

1953

1954

1955

1956

1957

1958

1959

1961

1962

Revival

In 2012, John C. Alsedek and Dana Perry-Hayes of Blue Hours Productions revived Suspense for Sirius XM Radio, recording all-new scripts including originals and adaptations of works by the likes of H.P. Lovecraft, Cornell Woolrich, and Clark Ashton Smith. The Suspense revival is currently airing on nearly 250 radio stations worldwide, and nominated for a Peabody Award.

Season One episodes
 "Cool Air," starring Adrienne Wilkinson & Daamen Krall
 "The Pipes of Tcho Ktlan," starring Daamen Krall & Rocky Cerda
 "The Return of the Sorcerer," starring Tucker Smallwood & Ron Bottitta
 "Proof in the Pudding," starring Adrienne Wilkinson & Christina Joy Howard
 "The Devil‘s Saint," starring Daamen Krall & Christopher Duva
 "Gag Reflex," starring Daamen Krall & Elizabeth Gracen
 "The Graveyard Rats," starring Daamen Krall & Christopher Duva
 "An Ungentle Wager," starring Elizabeth Gracen & Adrienne Wilkinson
 "The Fire of Asshurbanipal," starring Christopher Duva & Steve Moulton
 "The Walls Between Us," starring Adrienne Wilkinson & Rocky Cerda
 "The Horla," starring Christopher Duva & Elizabeth Gracen
 "Essence," starring Dana Perry-Hayes & Skyler Caleb
 "The Hounds of Tindalos," starring Christopher Duva & Daamen Krall
 "Madeline’s Veil," starring Dana Perry-Hayes & Rocky Cerda
 "Wet Saturday," starring Daamen Krall & Adrienne Wilkinson
 "Forest of the Dark Unbound," starring Catherine Kamei & Elizabeth Gracen
 "Who Goes There?" starring Steve Moulton & Sean Hackman
 "De Vermis Manorum," starring Elizabeth Gracen & John Lauver
 "The Night Reveals," starring David Collins & Susan Eisenberg
 "Ebb Tide," starring Christopher Duva & Adrienne Wilkinson
 "Far Below," starring Daamen Krall & Catherine Kamei
 "Behind Every Great Man..." starring Brett Thompson & Adrienne Wilkinson
 "Pigeons From Hell," starring Scott Henry & Daniel Hackman
 "Red Rook, White King...Black Cat," starring Adrienne Wilkinson & David Collins

See also

Suspense (U.S. TV series)
Academy Award
Author's Playhouse
The Campbell Playhouse
Cavalcade of America
CBS Radio Mystery Theater
The CBS Radio Workshop
Ford Theatre
General Electric Theater
Lux Radio Theater
The Mercury Theatre on the Air
Screen Director's Playhouse
The Screen Guild Theater
The United States Steel Hour

References

Sources

Frank M. Passage log: Suspense

External links

Escape and Suspense

Old Time Radio Review: Suspense – episode reviews
OTR Plot Spot: Suspense – plot summaries and reviews.
Suspense on Way Back When
'Podcast Feed'

1942 radio dramas
American radio dramas
CBS Radio programs
1940s American radio programs
1950s American radio programs
1960s American radio programs
Anthology radio series
Fantasy radio programs
Horror fiction radio programmes
American science fiction radio programs
Edgar Award-winning works
Peabody Award-winning radio programs
United States National Recording Registry recordings